IQ and Global Inequality is a 2006 book by psychologist Richard Lynn and political scientist Tatu Vanhanen. IQ and Global Inequality is follow-up to their 2002 book IQ and the Wealth of Nations, an expansion of the argument that international differences in current economic development are due in part to differences in average national intelligence as indicated by national IQ estimates, and a response to critics. The book was published by Washington Summit Publishers, a white nationalist and eugenicist publishing group.

Lynn and Vanhanen's research on national IQs has attracted widespread criticism of the book's scores, methodology, and conclusions.

Summary 
In IQ and Global Inequality Lynn and Vanhanen argue that intelligence, as measured by IQ tests, is a major contributor to national wealth as well as to various measures of social well-being. They base this argument on the finding that nations' average IQs have a strong correlation with several such factors, among them adult literacy (0.64), tertiary education (0.75), life expectancy (0.77), and democratization (0.57). The book is a follow-up to Lynn and Vanhanen's 2002 book IQ and the Wealth of Nations, and expands on many of the ideas presented in their earlier book.

IQ and Global Inequality responds to some of the criticisms directed against the earlier book. To address the criticism that measures of national IQ are unreliable, for 71 nations they measure national IQs using two different methods, and find that the correlation between different measures of national IQ is 0.95. As a further argument for reliability, they find that their reported national IQs are correlated with various measures of math and science achievement, with correlations ranging from 0.79 to 0.89.

Finally, the book presents the authors' theory as to the cause of national IQs. They propose a model of gene-environment interaction in which high IQ leads to better nutrition, education and health care, further enhancing IQ. They also propose that the racial composition of countries is an important factor in national IQs. They base this conclusion on the observation that national IQs can generally be predicted from the countries' racial composition, and that national IQs of racially similar countries tend to cluster together.

National IQ and QHC values 
Lynn and Vanhanen base their analysis on  selected IQ data from studies which covered 113 nations. For another 79 nations, they estimated the mean IQs on the basis of the arithmetic means of the measured IQs of neighboring countries. They justify this method of estimation by claiming that the correlation between the estimated national IQs they reported in IQ and the Wealth of Nations and the measured national IQs since obtained is very high (0.91).

Lynn and Vanhanen calculated the national IQs in relation to a British mean of 100, with a standard deviation of 15. They adjusted all test results to account for the Flynn effect: adjustments were 2 points per decade for Raven's Progressive Matrices and 3 points per decade for all other types of tests. When two IQ studies were used from one country, their mean was calculated, whereas when three or more were available, the median was used.

Reception

Academic reviews of the book generally criticized both its methodology and conclusions.

The methodology of the study was criticized by Richard E. Nisbett for relying on small and haphazard samples and for ignoring data that did not support the conclusions.

University of Reading geographer Stephen Morse also criticized the book (as well as IQ and the Wealth of Nations), arguing that the authors' hypothesis rests on "serious flaws". Morse also argued: "The central dilemma of the Lynn and Vanhanen case rests with their assumption that national IQ data are primarily (not wholly) a function of innate ability, which in turn is at least partly generated by genes. There are many assumptions of cause–effect in here, and some of them involve substantial leaps of faith."

Psychologist J. Philippe Rushton, president of the Pioneer Fund that has been a long time funder of research by Lynn, reviewed the book in 2006 for Personality and Individual Differences. Rushton wrote that the book extends and answers criticisms against the earlier work in several ways, and believed that the methods were accurate.

Evolutionary psychologist Satoshi Kanazawa claimed in 2008 to have found support for Lynn's theories. Kanazawa's study has been criticized for using the Pythagorean theorem to estimate geographic distance, despite the fact that this theorem is incompatible with the shape of the earth. Other problems identified with this study include that Kanazawa incorrectly assumed that individuals migrated from Africa to other continents along linear trajectories, irrespective of physical boundaries, and ignored the fact that geographic distance and evolutionary novelty do not always correspond to each other.

In an article published in the European Journal of Personality, Heiner Rindermann compared the IQ scores from the book to a large number of international student assessment studies on subjects such as reading, mathematics, science, and problem solving, and found them to be highly intercorrelated. Statistical analyses indicated that the results could be explained by an underlying general cognitive ability. More than 30 commentaries on Rindermann's findings were published in the same issue of the journal.

In a 2008 study published in the journal Intelligence, Garry Gelade reported a strong relationship between the book's national IQ estimates and the country's geographical location. On this basis, he concluded that book's findings were "defensible".

In the 2010 paper "A systematic literature review of the average IQ of sub-Saharan Africans", also published in Intelligence, Jelte M. Wicherts and colleagues stated:

Lynn and Meisenberg replied that "critical evaluation of the studies presented by WDM shows that many of these are based on unrepresentative elite samples" and that a further literature review, including taking into account results in mathematics, science, and reading, gave  "an IQ of 68 as the best reading of the IQ in sub-Saharan Africa". Wicherts and colleagues in yet another reply stated: "In light of all the available IQ data of over 37,000 African testtakers, only the use of unsystematic methods to exclude the vast majority of data could result in a mean IQ close to 70. On the basis of sound methods, the average IQ remains close to 80. Although this mean IQ is clearly lower than 100, we view it as unsurprising in light of the potential of the Flynn effect in Africa (Wicherts, Borsboom, & Dolan, 2010) and common psychometric problems associated with the use of western IQ tests among Africans."

Consequently, some later studies using average national IQ data have checked their results against both data sets.

Economists Jones and Schneider, commenting for Economic Inquiry said that the books appropriately summarized the previous volume's findings.

Earl Hunt cited this work as an example of scientists going far beyond the empirical support to make controversial policy recommendations, and as such as examples of irresponsible uses of science. Hunt argues that in their argumentation they both made the basic mistake of assigning causality to a correlation without evidence, and that they made "staggeringly low" estimates of Sub-Saharan African IQs based on highly problematic data. He considers that by their negligence of observing good scientific practice Lynn and Vanhanen are not living up to the basic responsibility of scientists to make sure that their results can function as reasonable empirical support for policy decisions.

On July 27, 2020, the European Human Behavior and Evolution Association issued a formal statement opposing the utilization of Lynn's national IQ dataset, citing various methodological concerns. They concluded "Any conclusions drawn from analyses which use these data are therefore unsound, and no reliable evolutionary work should be using these data."

See also
 Race and intelligence
 Evolution of human intelligence
 Cattell Culture Fair Intelligence Test
 Eugenics
 Intelligence and public policy
 Scientific racism

Publications
 The Mismeasure of Man - Stephen Jay Gould (1981) 
 The Bell Curve - Richard J. Herrnstein and Charles Murray (1994) 
 Race Differences in Intelligence - Richard Lynn (2006)

References 

2006 non-fiction books
Books about human intelligence
Books about wealth distribution
Books by Richard Lynn
Books by Tatu Vanhanen
Race and intelligence controversy
Eugenics books